A chrysanthemum is a flower.

Chrysanthemum also may refer to

Books
Chrysanthemum, a children's picture book by Kevin Henkes
"The Chrysanthemums", a 1937 short story by John Steinbeck

Film, television, and stage
"Chrysanthemum", episode of I Spy
"The Chrysanthemums", 1990 short film
Chrysanthemum (1956), the British stage musical that inspired Thoroughly Modern Millie

Music
"Crisantemi", string quartet composition dating from 1890 by Puccini
"The Chrysanthemum", piano composition by Scott Joplin
"Chrysanthemum", a 2007 song by Kelley Polar
"Chrysanthemum", a song by the Canadian band Download from Effector
The Chrysanthemums (band), English art-pop group

Other
HMS Chrysanthemum (1917)
Chrysanthemum (cocktail), a mixed alcoholic drink made with dry vermouth, Bénédictine, and absinthe
Chrysanthemum Throne, the throne of the Emperor of Japan

See also